The Berthelot River is a tributary of the Mégiscane River, flowing into the townships of Leigne, Valmy and Berthelot, in the territory of Senneterre, in La Vallée-de-l'Or Regional County Municipality, in the Abitibi-Témiscamingue administrative region, in Quebec, in Canada.

The Berthelot River flows entirely in forest zone, west of the Gouin Reservoir. Forestry is the main economic activity of this hydrographic slope; recreational tourism activities, second. The surface of the river is usually frozen from mid-December to mid-April.

The west side of the Berthelot River head zone is served by a forest road from Forsythe. The head lake is near the Canadian National Railway which passes further south.

Geography

Toponymy
The term "Berthelot" is a family name of French origin.

The toponym "Berthelot River" was formalized on December 5, 1968, at the Commission de toponymie du Québec, when it was created.

See also

References

External links 

Jamésie
La Vallée-de-l’Or
Rivers of Abitibi-Témiscamingue
Nottaway River drainage basin